The canton of Villeparisis is a French administrative division, located in the arrondissement of Torcy, in the Seine-et-Marne département (Île-de-France région).

Composition 
Following the French canton reorganisation which came into effect in March 2015, the composition of the canton of Villeparisis is:
 Brou-sur-Chantereine
 Courtry
 Le Pin
 Vaires-sur-Marne
 Villeparisis
 Villevaudé

Adjacent cantons 
 Canton of Mitry-Mory (north)
 Canton of Claye-Souilly (northeast)
 Canton of Lagny-sur-Marne (east)
 Canton of Chelles (west)
 Canton of Torcy (southeast)
 Canton of Champs-sur-Marne (south)

See also
Cantons of the Seine-et-Marne department
Communes of the Seine-et-Marne department

References

Villeparisis